The Academy for Jewish Religion (AJR) is a rabbinical school in Yonkers, New York.

History
The Academy for Jewish Religion was founded in 1956 as a rabbinical school. Initially called the Academy for Liberal Judaism (and then the Academy for Higher Jewish Learning), it was granted a charter to ordain rabbis by the Regents of the University of the State of New York.

Accreditation

AJR is accredited by the Association of Theological Schools in the United States and Canada. It is currently the only Jewish organization out of more than 270 ATS-accredited seminaries and divinity schools.

References

Jewish seminaries
Non-denominational Judaism
Jewish organizations established in 1956
Educational institutions established in 1956
1956 establishments in New York (state)
Schools in Yonkers, New York